Bapna is an Indian surname. Notable people with the surname include:

 Rajiv Bapna, Indian businessman 
 Ravi Bapna, Indian-born American data scientist
 Shruti Bapna, Indian television actress

Indian surnames